1,5-Diaminonaphthalene is an organic compound with the formula CH(NH).  It is one of several diaminonaphthalenes. It is a colorless solid that darkens in air due to oxidation.

Synthesis and reactions
It is prepared by reduction of 1,5-dinitronaphthalene, which in turn is obtained with the 1,8-isomers by nitration of 1-nitronaphthalene. It can also be prepared by treatment of 1,5-dihydroxynaphthalene with ammonium sulfite. It is a precursor to naphthalene-1,5-diisocyanate, a precursor to specialty polyurethanes.

See also
 C10H10N2

References

Naphthylamines
Diamines